Putilin is a Russian masculine surname, its feminine counterpart is Putilina. It may refer to
Maksim Putilin (born 1966), Russian football player
Roman Putilin (born 1990), Russian football player
Sergei Putilin (born 1986), Russian football player

Russian-language surnames